The Grimshaw Silk Mill, also known as Freeman Shoes, is an historic factory building which is located in Reading, Berks County, Pennsylvania.

It was listed on the National Register of Historic Places in 1985.

History and architectural features
This silk mill was built in 1887 and then rebuilt in 1889, after a tornado destroyed the original building on January 9, 1889, killing nineteen employees and injuring one hundred.

It is a three-story, rectangular, brick building measuring fifty feet by two hundred and fifty feet. A stair tower is topped by a pyramidal roof. It sits on a rubble stone basement and features pilasters, brownstone keystones and a pressed metal cornice.

It was listed on the National Register of Historic Places in 1985.

References

Industrial buildings and structures on the National Register of Historic Places in Pennsylvania
Industrial buildings completed in 1889
Buildings and structures in Berks County, Pennsylvania
Silk mills in the United States
National Register of Historic Places in Reading, Pennsylvania